Shalom was the first Jewish newspaper published in Iran. Launched in Iran's capital Tehran in 1915 (then Qajar Iran), it was founded by Mordechai Ben Avraham (1888-1964). Its chief editor was Mordechai's brother, Asher (1890-1963). The first issue was specifically chosen to be published on Nowruz (March 21 1915), the day of the Iranian New Year. The estalishment of the newspaper was made possible through the Persian Constitutional Revolution. The newspaper was written in Judeo-Persian.

References

Jewish newspapers
1915 establishments in Iran
Newspapers published in Qajar Iran
Mass media in Tehran
Jews and Judaism in Persia and Iran
Defunct newspapers published in Iran